Atelosteogenesis type I is a rare autosomal dominant condition. This condition is evident at birth and is associated with a very poor prognosis for the baby. It may be diagnosed antenatally.

Signs and symptoms
Clinical features include

 Abnormal facies
Prominent forehead
Hypertelorism
Depressed nasal bridge with a grooved tip
Micrognathia
Cleft palate
 Severe short limbed dwarfism
 Joint dislocations (hip, knee and elbow joints)
 Club feet
 Cardiorespiratory failure

Cardiorespiratory failure is due to pulmonary hypoplasia or tracheobronchial hypoplasia.

Genetics

This condition is caused by mutations in the filamin B (FLNB) gene. This gene is located on the short arm of chromosome 3 (3p14).

Pathogenesis

Filamin B forms part of the actin cytoskeleton. How these mutations produce the clinical picture is not yet clear.

Diagnosis

This condition is evident at birth and may be diagnosed antenatally with ultrasound or magnetic resonance imaging. The infants may be still born. Those that are live born do not survive long.

Radiological findings include

 Severe platyspondyly
 Distally tapered, shortened, incomplete or absent humeri and femurs
 Shortened or bowed radii, ulnas and tibias
 Hypoplastic pelvis and fibulas
 Deficient ossification of the metacarpals, middle and proximal phalanges

Differential diagnosis

This includes

 Achondroplasia
 Achondrogenesis
 Atelosteogenesis III 
 Boomerang dysplasia 
 Campomelic dysplasia
 Ellis–Van Creveld syndrome
 Hypophosphatasia 
 Melnick Needles syndrome
 Metatropic dysplasia
 Osteogenesis imperfecta
 Roberts syndrome 
 Short-rib polydactyly syndrome
 Thanatophoric dysplasia

Treatment

There is currently no curative treatment for this condition. Supportive management is all that is currently available.

Epidemiology
This is a rare condition with a prevalence of less than 1/106. The total number of cases reported to date is less than 20.

History

This condition was first described by Maroteaux et al. in 1982.

References 

Genetic diseases and disorders
Rare diseases